William Henry Garvie (31 December 1910 – 27 June 1944) was an Australian rules footballer who played with Richmond. Winning the Richmond Reserves best and fairest in 1935, he was killed in an accident while serving in the army during World War II.

Family
The son of George William Austin Garvie (1885–1955), and Mary Garvie, William Henry Garvie was born at Cobden, Victoria on 31 December 1910. He married Jean Kathleen Crawford in 1938.

Football

Richmond (VFL)
Cleared from Hamilton to Richmond, Garvie played a total of nine First XVIII games and 29 Second XVIII games over two seasons (1934 and 1935). He won the Second XVIII best and fairest in 1935.

Carlton (VFL)
Transferred to Carlton in 1936, he played 13 games and scored 18 goals for the Carlton Second XVIII in that single season. He did not play a single game for the Carlton First XVIII.

Oakleigh (VFA)
Transferred from Carlton to Oakleigh, Garvie played for Oakleigh First XVIII for the first four matches of the 1937 season.

Cricket
Garvie played two District Cricket matches for the Richmond Cricket Club's First XI in the 1933–34 season.

Military service
Employed as a conductor by the Melbourne & Metropolitan Tramways Board, he enlisted in the Second Australian Imperial Force  in November 1942, and served in the 20th Field Bakery Platoon of the Royal Australian Army Service Corps.

Death
Seriously injured (fractured skull, fractured spine,  etc.) in an accident on 26 June 1944 (the military vehicle he was in overturned), he died of his injuries the next day. He was buried at the Atherton War Cemetery in Queensland.

See also
 List of Victorian Football League players who died in active service

Footnotes

References
 Hogan P: The Tigers Of Old, Richmond FC, (Melbourne), 1996. 
 Holmesby, Russell & Main, Jim (2007). The Encyclopedia of AFL Footballers. 7th ed. Melbourne: Bas Publishing.
 Main, J. & Allen, D., "Garvie, Bill", pp.247–248 in Main, J. & Allen, D., Fallen – The Ultimate Heroes: Footballers Who Never Returned From War, Crown Content, (Melbourne), 2002. 
 World War Two Service Record: Private William Henry Garvie (VX90751), National Archives of Australia.
 World War Two Nominal Roll: Private William Henry Garvie (VX90751), Department of Veterans' Affairs.
 Roll of Honour: Private William Henry Garvie (VX90751), Australian War Memorial.
 Roll of Honour Circular: Private William Henry Garvie (VX90751), collection of the Australian War Memorial.
 Australian Army Casualties: Australia and the Islands: Died of Injuries Accidentally Received, The Argus, (Friday, 25 August 1944), p.5.
 Death Notices: On Active Service: Garvie, The Herald, (Saturday, 1 July 1944), p.4.
 Private William Henry Garvie (VX90751), Commonwealth War Graves Commission.

External links 
 
 
 Bill Garvie, at Blueseum.
 W. "Bill" Garvie, at The VFA Project.

1910 births
1944 deaths
Australian rules footballers from Victoria (Australia)
Richmond Football Club players
Oakleigh Football Club players
Richmond cricketers
Australian military personnel killed in World War II
Road incident deaths in Queensland
Australian Army personnel of World War II
Australian Army soldiers